The 1930 Star Riders' Championship was the second edition of the speedway Star Riders' Championship. The competition was decided on a knockout basis over eight heats.

Final 
12 September 1930
 Wembley, England

Heat details
Heat 1 : Arthur, Taylor, Stevenson (Fell)
Heat 2 : Taft, Frogley (Fell), Jackson (Fell)
Heat 3 : Huxley, Watson, Kempster
Heat 4 : Ormston, Burton (Ret), Farndon (Ret)

Semi-final 1 : Arthur, Taylor, Taft
Semi-final 2 : Huxley, Ormston, Watson

Final (1st leg): Huxley, Arthur
Final (2nd leg): Huxley, Arthur

References

1930
Speedway
1930 in speedway